The Modern Jazz Sextet is a jazz album featuring the combined talents of Dizzy Gillespie, Sonny Stitt, John Lewis, Percy Heath, Skeeter Best and Charlie Persip. The album was conceived by producer Norman Granz for his own label, Norgran Records. Although no single album artist is credited as a bandleader for this album, Verve Records - which owns the Norgran catalogue - files it as a Dizzy Gillespie album.

Two of the album's rhythm section - Lewis and Heath - also feature in the 1952-founded Modern Jazz Quartet.

Reception

AllMusic gives the album 4 stars, stating that "it did not take too much insight to realize that putting trumpeter Dizzy Gillespie and altoist Sonny Stitt together with a strong rhythm section would result in some explosive music. ...Bebop at its best."

Track listing
 "Tour De Force" (Dizzy Gillespie) - 11:39
 "Dizzy Meets Sonny" (Gillespie) - 7:59
 "Ballad Medley: Old Folks/What's New?/How Deep is the Ocean?" (Dedette Lee Hill, Willard Robison/Bob Haggart, Johnny Burke/Irving Berlin) - 7:10
 "Mean to Me" (Roy Turk, Fred E. Ahlert) - 6:30
 "Blues for Bird" (Sonny Stitt, Gillespie) - 9:08

Credits
Dizzy Gillespie - trumpet
Sonny Stitt - alto saxophone
John Lewis - piano
Percy Heath - double bass
Skeeter Best - guitar
Charlie Persip - drums
Norman Granz - producer

References 

1956 albums
Dizzy Gillespie albums
Sonny Stitt albums
Albums produced by Norman Granz
Norgran Records albums
Verve Records albums